Google Fit is a health-tracking platform developed by Google for the Android operating system, Wear OS and Apple Inc.'s iOS. It is a single set of APIs that blends data from multiple apps and devices. Google Fit uses sensors in a user's activity tracker or mobile device to record physical fitness activities (such as walking, cycling, etc.), which are measured against the user's fitness goals to provide a comprehensive view of their fitness.

History
Google Fit was announced at the Google I/O conference on June 25, 2014. A software development kit for Google Fit was released on August 7, 2014. Fit launched to the public on October 28, 2014.

In August 2018, Google announced a revamp to its Android Fit platform which adds activity goals based on activity recommendations from the American Heart Association and the World Health Organization.  The updates are meant to help Fit better provide metrics for activities other than walking and encourage users to engage in activities that will raise the heart rate without necessarily requiring a trip to the gym.

In April 2019, Google announced Google Fit for iOS offering similar experience to its Android counterpart. Google Fit for iOS used Apple Health, Nike Run Club, Headspace or connected device such as Apple Watch or Wear OS smartwatch connected to user device. In August 2019, Google announced dark theme, sleep insights and workout map feature availability.

In April 2020, Google redesigned Google Fit. In November 2020, Google Fit added iOS 14 widget.

In February 2021, Google announced Pixel 5 exclusive feature for Google Fit, heart rate and respiratory measurement using Pixel 5's camera.

In June 2021, Google announced support for paced walking. Google announced unmentioned metrics in Google Fit to be deleted within 30 days.

Functionality
Google Fit provides a single set of APIs for apps and device manufacturers to store and access activity data from fitness apps and sensors on Android and other devices (like wearables, heart rate monitors or connected scales). Users can choose who their fitness data is shared with as well as delete this information at any time.

See also
 AllTrails
 Health (Apple)
 Samsung Health
 MSN Health & Fitness
 Runkeeper
 Strava

References

External links
Google Fit website
Google Fit SDK homepage 

Fit
Health software
Fitness apps
Activity trackers
Android (operating system) software
2014 software
Computer-related introductions in 2014
Wear OS software